The 1968 Rutgers Scarlet Knights football team represented Rutgers University in the 1968 NCAA University Division football season. In their ninth season under head coach John F. Bateman, the Scarlet Knights compiled an 8–2 record with their sole losses coming against Army and Cornell. The team won the Middle Three Conference championship and outscored their opponents 276 to 182 . The team's statistical leaders included Rich Policastro with 994 passing yards, Bryant Mitchell with 1,204 rushing yards, and Bob Stonebraker with 448 receiving yards.

Schedule

References

Rutgers
Rutgers Scarlet Knights football seasons
Rutgers Scarlet Knights football